The Apple A8 is a 64-bit ARM-based system on a chip (SoC) designed by Apple Inc. It first appeared in the iPhone 6 and iPhone 6 Plus, which were introduced on September 9, 2014. Apple states that it has 25% more CPU performance and 50% more graphics performance while drawing only 50% of the power of its predecessor, the Apple A7. The latest software updates for the 1.1GHz and 1.4GHz variants systems using this chip are iOS 12.5.6, released on August 31, 2022 as they were discontinued with the release of iOS 13 in 2019, and 1.5GHz variant for the iPad Mini 4 is iPadOS 15.7.1, released on October 27, 2022 as it was discontinued with the release of iPadOS 16 in 2022, while updates for the 1.5GHz variant continue for Apple TV HD. The A8 chip was discontinued on October 18, 2022, following the discontinuation of the Apple TV HD.

Design 
The A8 is manufactured on a 20 nm process by TSMC, which replaced Samsung as the manufacturer of Apple's mobile device processors. It contains 2 billion transistors. The A8 uses LPDDR3-1333 RAM on a 64-bit memory interface; in the iPhone 6/6 Plus, sixth generation iPod Touch, and HomePod, the A8 has 1 GB RAM included in the package. Meanwhile, the A8 in the iPad Mini 4 and 4th generation Apple TV is packaged with 2 GB RAM.

The A8 CPU has a per-core L1 cache of 64 KB for data and 64 KB for instructions, an L2 cache of 1 MB shared by both CPU cores, and a 4 MB L3 cache that services the entire SoC. As its predecessor, it has a 6 decode, 6 issue, 9 wide, out-of-order design.
The processor is dual core, and as used in the iPhone 6 has a frequency of 1.4 GHz, supporting Apple's claim of it being 25% faster than the A7. It also supports the notion of this being a second generation enhanced Cyclone core called Typhoon, and not an entirely new architecture which would supposedly mean a more significant performance gain per Hz.

The A8 also integrates a graphics processing unit (GPU) which is a 4-shader-cluster PowerVR Series 6XT. However the GPU features custom shader cores designed by Apple.

On October 16, 2014, Apple introduced a variant of the A8, the A8X, in the iPad Air 2. Compared with the A8, the A8X has an enhanced 8-shader-cluster GPU and improved CPU performance due to one extra core and higher frequency.

The A8 has video codec encoding support for H.264. It has decoding support for H.264, MPEG‑4, and Motion JPEG.

Patent litigation 
The A8's branch predictor has been claimed to infringe on a 1998 patent. On October 14, 2015, a district judge found Apple guilty of infringing U.S. patent , "Table based data speculation circuit for parallel processing computer", on the Apple A7 and A8 processors. The patent is owned by Wisconsin Alumni Research Foundation (WARF), a firm affiliated with the University of Wisconsin. On July 24, 2017, Apple was ordered to pay WARF $506 million for patent infringement. Apple filed an appellate brief on October 26, 2017, with the U.S. Court of Appeals for the Federal Circuit, that argued that Apple did not infringe on the patent owned by the Wisconsin Alumni Research Foundation. On September 28, 2018, the ruling was overturned on appeal and the award thrown out by the U.S. Federal Circuit Court of Appeals. The patent expired in December 2016.

Products that include the Apple A8 
 iPhone 6 & 6 Plus
 iPod Touch (6th generation)
 iPad Mini 4
 Apple TV HD (formerly 4th generation)
 HomePod (1st generation)

Gallery

See also 
 Apple silicon, the range of ARM-based processors designed by Apple.
 Comparison of ARMv8-A cores
 Apple A8X

Notes

References 

Computer-related introductions in 2014
Products and services discontinued in 2019
Products and services discontinued in 2022
Apple silicon